The Communist Party of Nepal (Janamukhi) was a communist splinter group in Nepal. The party was led by Rupchandra Bista. A group around Ram Narayan Bidari broke away from the party, and joined the Communist Party of Nepal (Unity Centre) in 1990.

See also
 List of communist parties in Nepal

References

Defunct communist parties in Nepal
Political schisms
Political parties disestablished in 1990
1990 disestablishments in Nepal